Enonselkä Basin is a lake basin of Lake Vesijärvi in Lahti in southern Finland. The mean depth of the lake basin is 16.2 metres.
The basin suffered severe effects of eutrophication in the 1960s and a restoration programme began in the 1970s. In the middle of the Enonselkä Basin is Enonsaari island.

Drainage basins of Finland